Vacuolar-sorting protein SNF8 is a protein that in humans is encoded by the SNF8 gene.

Model organisms
				
Model organisms have been used in the study of SNF8 function. A conditional knockout mouse line, called Snf8tm1a(EUCOMM)Wtsi was generated as part of the International Knockout Mouse Consortium program — a high-throughput mutagenesis project to generate and distribute animal models of disease to interested scientists.

Male and female animals underwent a standardized phenotypic screen to determine the effects of deletion. Twenty five tests were carried out on mutant mice and two significant abnormalities were observed.  No homozygous mutant embryos were identified during gestation, and therefore none survived until weaning. The remaining tests were carried out on heterozygous mutant adult mice; no additional significant abnormalities were observed in these animals.

References

Further reading

Genes mutated in mice